Boletellus cyanescens is a species of fungus in the family Boletaceae. Found in Papua New Guinea, it was described as new to science by the Austrian mycologist Egon Horak in 1977.

References

Fungi of New Guinea
cyanescens
Fungi described in 1977